Iron Custom Motorcycles (ICM) — Ukrainian custom motorcycle workshop. The company was founded in Kharkiv in 2010 by Yaroslav Lutytskyi. ICM is the first Ukrainian custom-workshop, which introduced its country at the World and European championships on customizing. In 2016, ICM has become a winner of the AMD World Championship of Custom Bike Building in café racer class, with “Beckman” project. In 2017, the ICM team set a world speed record in the class 350APS-VG with the project "Inspirium" (within Bonneville Speed Week).

Awards on the championships

Projects

The first 
The company's first project, which participated in the international championship. Donor bike for the project was the HD Night Rod Special, released in 2009. Custom designed in the style of HD and is fully compliant with HD-standards. Engineering calculations were borrowed from Porsche, engine – company Rotax. Body kit and motorcycle wheels — V-Rod - No-Limit-Custom. Tire casings from Avon Venom. The fuel controller and exhaust pipe – Vance&Hines. The model is equipped with full pneumatic suspension and front fork with traverses from Tricky Air. The computerized system allows to change the suspension height, stiffness and pumping order.

Fetish 
Donor for the future custom became Harley Davidson HD Rocker C of 2008. The project is equipped with a hydraulic clutch linkage and suspension B-17 PD “Black Widow”. In addition, ICM craftsmen installed unilateral idler arm War Eagle and progressive suspension Air Tail.

Sturmvogel 
The custom was based on the idea of “Dieselpunk” style model, rocket shaped and with maximal functionalism. Harley-Davidson XR 1200 of 2009 model year was the basis. The model is equipped with sports slick tires RSD, braking systems and machines from PM, running boards and damper from LSL. The rear suspension was designed on the basis of racing technology — with a single shock absorber under the engine. Creators made the custom's back lighter by shifting down the center of gravity. Oil tank is moved under the engine and control unit — to the tail of the model. Under the lower cowling radiator and other parts are located. Titanium exhaust system of the company Zard is installed.

“Dry” system of nitrous oxide, which increases the power of the bike by 20 horsepower to the already existing 80 is added. Semi-automatic clutch EFI adapted specifically for the custom.

Body kit is made of fiberglass popular in the 50s, 60s — a design decision within the framework of the selected futuristic style. The style is supplemented with a custom body kit in the form of the monocoque without visible mounting points.

Beckman 
The basis for the idea of this model customizing has served the domestic motorcycle. By all parameters the project was created as a Café Racer of the late 1970s - early 1980s. For this reason, in creation of this model only domestic parts of 1960-1980s were used, the remaining components were created by ICM craftsmen by hand, but with preservation of the technologies of the above-mentioned period.

The project name was chosen in honor of William Beckman – Soviet design engineer, professor, sportsman and instructor of motorcycle sport. Wilhelm Beckmann – the author of many books on motorsport and motorcycle design, based on which the custom was built, fully modified by engineering and design technologies of the time.

Custom was created from a donor IZH Jupiter-4 1982. After complete modification of the model, the original parts in the motorcycle are almost gone.

World speed record of the motorcycle Inspirium 
On the 13 of August 2017, the ICM team set a world speed record on a specially created motorcycle Inspirium class 350APS-VG.

This class includes specially built vintage motorcycles with a fairing, an engine volume of up to 350 cm3, manufactured before 1955, working on gasoline and deprived of modern electronic devices (injectors, computers, etc.).

The world record was set on Lake Bonneville, as part of the Bonnewille Speed Week 2017.

The ICM team set a world speed record on the Inspirium 350APS-VG motorcycle on the 13 of August 2017 at 07:53, its record speed is 99,764 mph.

The speed of the motorcycle during the first lap was 99,197 miles per hour, the speed during the second lap was 100,331 miles per hour, the maximum average speed during the race was 104,106 miles per hour.

Previous record 
The previous record in this class was set in 2013 by the French team Ecole De La Performance on the motorcycle AMC and equals 86,818 miles per hour.

Inspirium specifications

References 

Custom motorcycles
Motorcycle manufacturers of Ukraine
Organizations based in Kharkiv
Vehicle manufacturing companies established in 2010
Ukrainian companies established in 2010